Kudrat is a 1981 Indian Hindi-language drama film, written and directed by Chetan Anand. The film stars Rajesh Khanna and Hema Malini, supported by Raaj Kumar, Priya Rajvansh and Vinod Khanna. This is the second movie of the Rajesh Khanna-Hema Malini pair with a reincarnation theme after Mehbooba. Kudrat in the year 1981, grossed Rs.4.00 crores at the box office. Rajesh Khanna received the 1982 All-India Critics Association (AICA) Best Actor Award for Kudrat. The film was a box office hit and it won the Filmfare Award for Best Story.

Plot
Chandramukhi (Hema Malini), accompanied by her parents, visits the hill resort of Shimla for the first time in her life. She senses some familiarity with the place and gets strange feelings, for which she does not know the reason. Chandramukhi and her family meet Dr. Naresh Gupta (Vinod Khanna). Naresh is attracted towards Chandramukhi and their families talk about getting them married to each other. Mohan Kapur (Rajesh Khanna), an upcoming lawyer, comes to Shimla to meet his patron and godfather, Janak Singh (Raaj Kumar). Mohan owes his education and career to Janak Singh's generosity. Janak Singh wants his daughter Karuna, also a lawyer, to marry Mohan. Mohan agrees out of gratitude to his patron and gets engaged to Karuna.

Once, Chandramukhi dashes into Mohan and feels some strange connection with him.  Mohan also meets an elderly singer named Saraswati Devi. She is shocked to see him, but does not say anything. Whenever Chandramukhi meets Mohan, she acts strangely. She has nightmares of a man named Madhav, who is Mohan's doppelganger, plummeting to death from a cliff. Naresh senses that something is amiss and coerces Mohan to help him find the truth. On an excursion, Chandramukhi remembers everything: She was Paro in previous life and Madhav was her lover. A zamindar's son raped her and accidentally murdered her.

Here, Naresh too realizes that he should step out of their life, as their romance soon gets rekindled. Here, with help of Chandramukhi, Mohan soon finds out that Saraswati Devi is Satto, Madhav's sister. Satto tells them that the villain is none other than Janak. Mohan is in a dilemma: he has broken off his engagement with Karuna for Chandramukhi and now he has to drag Janak to court. Realizing that he has no other option, Mohan decides to take matters to the court. Karuna, who doesn't have an idea of the truth, steps in to defend her father against this "conspiracy".

Here, it is revealed that Janak is indeed guilty of the death of both Paro and Madhav. He raped Paro and after listening this, Madhav commits suicide. Paro had cursed him that just as he took away something precious to her, Mother Nature will take something important from him too. Meanwhile, Mohan seems to be losing the case, until he finds the mansion where Paro was purportedly murdered. He also traces Billi Ram, a senile old mason, who may hold a clue to Paro's disappearance. Billi Ram remembers that Janak had called him that day to patch up a wall in the mansion.

Mohan comes to the mansion with police, who tear the wall down. A skeleton tumbles out in front of Karuna. Shocked by this revelation, Karuna goes to her home and sets it on fire. She sits inside, playing a piano and succumbs to the fire. After learning of his daughter's death and the new discovery, Janak realizes that Paro's curse has done its work. Later, Janak pleads guilty for his crime in the court and is sentenced accordingly. As he is escorted out, he and Chandramukhi see each other for the last time. After Chandramukhi and Mohan get united, and Naresh heads to America.

Cast

Soundtrack
The film's music was composed by R. D. Burman and the lyrics written by Majrooh Sultanpuri and Qateel Shifai. While Majrooh wrote all the songs of the film, the title song "Dukh Sukh Ki Har Ek Mala" was written by Qateel Shifai. The song "Hamen Tumse Pyar Kitna" is heard twice in the film, the first time by a female singer (Parveen Sultana) and the second time by a male singer (Kishore Kumar). Kumar was nominated for a Filmfare Award for his rendering of the song, while Sultana walked away with the Filmfare Best Female Playback Award for her version of the song.

Accolades

 29th Filmfare Awards:

Won

 Best Female Playback Singer – Parveen Sultana for "Hume Tumse Pyaar Kitna"
 Best Story – Chetan Anand
 Best Cinematography – Jal Mistry

Nominated

 Best Male Playback Singer – Kishore Kumar for "Hume Tumse Pyaar Kitna"

References

External links 
 

Films scored by R. D. Burman
1981 films
Indian romantic drama films
1980s Hindi-language films
1981 romantic drama films
Films directed by Chetan Anand
Films about reincarnation
Fictional portrayals of the Maharashtra Police